The Leyland Landtrain was a truck that was produced in the 1980s by British Leyland. Designed for the export markets in Africa, Asia, Latin America and the Middle East, it was particularly popular in Nigeria, Kenya and Zimbabwe. The Landtrain was designed to be used in areas of limited infrastructure, where roads may be rough and fuel scarce. It was powered by four different engines and produced with three different gross vehicle weights (GVW),  and  

The Landtrain was produced as both a two-axle 4x2 and a three-axle 6x4 rigid and a 6x4 tractor. The truck was produced in the Leyland plant in Wolverhampton between 1980 and 1982, when production moved to Bathgate, and then finally to Watford in 1984. Kits were exported from these plants to Leyland factories in Ibadan, Nigeria, and Thika, Kenya, where they were assembled. The truck ceased production in 1987 after the merger of Leyland with the Dutch company DAF.

Design and development
Given the project designation of T129, the Landtrain was introduced by British Leyland and marketed as the first truck specifically built for the African, Asian, Latin American and Middle East markets. The design drew upon the expertise of Scammell Lorries, which was also owned by Leyland, and had produced a number of successful large military trucks, including the Commander. Similarly, the truck reflected the design of the Thornycroft tractors which were manufactured by the company at the same time. The Landtrain was produced in a range of variants, designated by a two figure nominal combining the gross vehicle weight (GVW) in tonnes and the designated engine power in brake horsepower (BHP). The truck was launched at the 1980 Geneva Motor Show.

The truck was a bonneted design optimised for operating over poor roads for long distances, where refuelling and servicing facilities were infrequent. Sitting behind rather than above the engine also gave the driver the advantage of not getting warmed by heat rising from the engine, an important consideration in hot climates.

In its three-axle form, the truck was available as a rigid, a tipper and a tractor.

Power and transmission
The truck was initially powered by a range of four different six cylinder diesel engines, all of  capacity. Two were produced by Leyland and two by Cummins, with each range including a less powerful naturally aspirated engine and a more powerful equipped with a turbocharger. The engine was an adaptation of the larger TL12, which had been previously used in the Marathon 2. The Cummins design featured a "big cam" design that provided better fuel economy.

Different gearboxes were used depending on the engine fitted. The L12 was matched to the six-speed Eaton 0403 gearbox with overdrive, while the nine-speed Fuller RT09509A or B range-change was used with the TL12 and NHC250. Both were constant-mesh designs. The NTE290 was initially mated with a six-speed ZFAK6-90 gearbox, but this was replaced by the Fuller unit during production. A Dana Splicer twin plate clutch was fitted.

The three axle version had double reduction to both rear axles. The three-seat cab was simple and was not fitted with air conditioning or other modern conveniences.

Production
Initially, the Landtrain was produced at the Guy Motors factory in Wolverhampton. Production was expected to be 1000 vehicles a year. Production subsequently moved to the plant in Bathgate in August 1982, which led to the closure of the Wolverhampton plant. Subsequently, when the Bathgate plant closed in June 1984, production was moved to the Scammell plant in Watford. In addition to complete trucks, the plants produced Complete Knock-Down (CKD) kits. These were partially completed vehicles which were exported widely to be assembled locally into vehicles. The Leyland plant in Thika, Kenya, and Ibadan, Nigeria were two of the main plants to receive CKDs. Vehicles were produced with combinations of engine power and GVW as 19–24, 19–29, 30–24, 30–29, 36-24 and 36–29. These designations were inscribed on the cab door.

The trucks were popular in Africa, particularly in Nigeria, Kenya and Zimbabwe. They were used for a wide range of tasks, whether general operations or more specialised work like providing emergency relief in Sudan or helping to rebuild the runway in Port Stanley after the Falklands War. A Landtrain came fifth overall, and first in its class, in the gruelling  three-day Argungu rally. The sponsor, an Alhaji Chanchanji, gave the prize money to an orphanage near to the Leyland factory in Nigeria.

In February 1987, Leyland merged with the Dutch firm DAF Trucks to form Leyland DAF. Bonneted trucks were dropped from the range and production of the Landtrain stopped following the merger.

References

Citations

Bibliography

 
 
 
 
 
 
 
 
 
 
 
 

Leyland vehicles
Rear-wheel-drive vehicles
Trucks
Vehicles introduced in 1980